"La Grange" is a song by the American rock group ZZ Top, from their 1973 album Tres Hombres. One of ZZ Top's most successful songs, it was released as a single in 1973 and received extensive radio play, rising to No. 41 on the Billboard Hot 100 in June 1974. The song refers to a brothel on the outskirts of La Grange, Texas (later called the "Chicken Ranch"). The brothel is also the subject of the Broadway play and film The Best Little Whorehouse in Texas.

The first time ZZ Top played the song in La Grange, Texas was during the Fayette County Fair on September 5, 2015. In March 2020 the song re-entered the Billboard charts following the release of the documentary ZZ Top: That Little Ol' Band from Texas.

Composition
The initial groove of the song is based on a traditional boogie blues rhythm used by John Lee Hooker in "Boogie Chillen'".

Background
A failed lawsuit by the copyright holder of "Boogie Chillen'" resulted in the court ruling that the rhythm was in the public domain. The line "a-how-how-how-how" is quoted from John Lee Hooker's song "Boom Boom".

In March 2005, Q placed "La Grange" at 92nd of the 100 Greatest Guitar Tracks. The song is also ranked No. 74 on Rolling Stone magazine's 100 Greatest Guitar Songs of All Time. Rolling Stone called the song, "...a standard for guitarists to show off their chops."

The single's B-side, "Just Got Paid", is from the band's second album Rio Grande Mud.

The song was produced by Bill Ham.

Reception
Cash Box called it a "hard driving delight certain to satisfy those fans of heavy blues."

Charts

Certifications

References

External links

1973 songs
1973 singles
London Records singles
ZZ Top songs
Songs about Texas
Songs written by Billy Gibbons
Songs written by Dusty Hill
Songs written by Frank Beard (musician)
Fayette County, Texas
Song recordings produced by Bill Ham